Revolution Hall is a music venue in the Buckman neighborhood of Portland, Oregon. It is located within the former Washington High School, and was originally constructed as the school's auditorium. The auditorium was in use from the school's opening in 1924 to its closure in 1981, and was unused until February 2015. As part of a larger redevelopment that saw the school converted into office and retail space, the auditorium was renovated into a music venue. During construction, two bars and a roof deck were added, but the original wooden seats were preserved.

The venue officially opened on April 17, 2015, with a concert by Neko Case.

Reception
Revolution Hall won in the "Best Patio" category, and earned second place in the "Best Music Venue" category, of Willamette Week "Best of Portland Readers' Poll 2020".

References

External links

2015 establishments in Oregon
Buckman, Portland, Oregon
Music venues in Portland, Oregon